The Cornelius Flagg Farmstead is a historic farm located on Tipton School Road in Sherman, Illinois. Cornelius Flagg, a farmer and lumber businessman from Ohio, established the farm in the 1870s. The farmhouse, the farm's main building, is a two-story brick Italianate building. The house has an asymmetrical pattern with hip roofs over each component. Several of its key Italianate features are not original; the wraparound front porch was replaced in 1930, and its bracketed cornice was reconstructed in the 1940s after tornadoes damaged the roof. The farm's brick barn is unusually well-crafted for a barn built during the period, a sign of Flagg's wealth. Other buildings on the farm include a machinery shed, a smaller and older farmhouse, a privy, and an ice house.

The farm was added to the National Register of Historic Places on February 3, 1993.

References

Farms on the National Register of Historic Places in Illinois
Italianate architecture in Illinois
National Register of Historic Places in Sangamon County, Illinois